Clarence Charles Bisby (10 September 1904 – 1977) was an English professional footballer who played in the Football League for Coventry City, Mansfield Town and Notts County.

References

1904 births
1977 deaths
English footballers
Association football defenders
English Football League players
Denaby United F.C. players
Notts County F.C. players
Coventry City F.C. players
Mansfield Town F.C. players
Peterborough United F.C. players